Yuba may refer to:

Places

 Yuba City, California
 Yuba County, California
 North Yuba AVA, California wine region in Yuba County
 Yuba, California, a former settlement
 Yuba River, a major river in California
 Yuba State Park, in Utah
 Yuba, Michigan
 Yuba, Wisconsin
 Yuba, a village in Shawo Township, Echeng District, Ezhou, Hubei

Other

 Yuba (food), one of the names of tofu skin, an East Asian food made from soybeans
 YUBA Liga, the premier basketball league of Serbia and Montenegro (named after Yugoslavia)
 Yuba College, the main campus for the Yuba Community College District in Marysville, California, United States
 Yuba Airport, Grand Traverse County, Michigan, United States
 Yuba County Airport, Yuba County, California, United States
 Yuba, fictional town in the manga One Piece

See also
 
 
 North Yuba (disambiguation)
 South Yuba (disambiguation)
 Juba (disambiguation)